Heteroclinus nasutus, the large-nose weedfish, is a species of clinid that is found in the waters of the Pacific Ocean coast of Australia where it prefers algae covered rocky outcrops along the coast down to a depth of about .  This species can reach a maximum length of  TL.

References

nasutus
Taxa named by Albert Günther
Fish described in 1861